Regina Krause (born 22 March 1949) is a German diver. She competed in the women's 10 metre platform event at the 1968 Summer Olympics.

References

External links
 

1949 births
Living people
German female divers
Olympic divers of West Germany
Divers at the 1968 Summer Olympics
People from Celle
Sportspeople from Lower Saxony
20th-century German women